Tepi is a hamlet in the historical region of Khevi, north-eastern Georgia. It is located on the left bank of the Tergi river. Administratively, it is part of the Kazbegi Municipality in Mtskheta-Mtianeti. Distance to the municipality center Stepantsminda is 44.5 km.
Hamlet was named after the Tepi mountain, elevation , located upstream of the small local creek.

Population 
According to the 2014 census, no one lives in the village anymore.

Sources 
 Georgian Soviet Encyclopedia, V. 9, p. 702, Tbilisi, 1985 year.

References

Kobi Community villages